Pontus Åberg (born 23 September 1993) is a Swedish professional ice hockey forward currently under contract with SC Rapperswil-Jona Lakers in the National League (NL). He was drafted in the second round of the 2012 NHL Entry Draft, 37th overall, by the Nashville Predators.

Playing career

Professional

SHL
Åberg represented team Stockholm at the Rikspucken, a national tournament in Sweden. He made his Elitserien debut during the 2010–11 season, as an extra forward in the second game of the season against Modo Hockey, but did not get any time on the ice. Åberg extended his contract with Djurgården to the 2013–14 season in May 2011. Åberg played a total of five games, scoring two points in the 2011 edition of the pre-season tournament European Trophy. Åberg received his first time on the ice in an Elitserien game and also scored his first goal in Elitserien in the league premier against HV71 on 15 September 2011. He scored the game-winning goal in the shootouts against Färjestad BK on 29 September 2011.

After a start to the 2011–12 Elitserien season that included getting five goals and three assists in the first fourteen games, Åberg was announced to be the first of four candidates for that season's Elitserien Rookie of the Year.

In the 2013–14 season, Åberg transferred to play for fellow SHL club, Färjestad BK.

Nashville Predators
After signing an entry-level contract with the Predators, he began his first North American season in 2014–15 season playing for the Predators American Hockey League (AHL) affiliate, the Milwaukee Admirals. In the 2016–17 NHL season Åberg appeared in 15 regular season games posting 1 goal and 1 assist with the Predators. In the AHL Åberg was effective potting 31 goals in just 56 games with the Admirals. After Ryan Johansen went down in Game 4 of the Western Conference Finals and it was announced that Johansen would be out for the remainder of the playoffs, and with Predators captain Mike Fisher being sidelined as well, the Predators called upon Colton Sissons and Åberg to help carry the offensive load. In game 5 Åberg scored the game-winning goal in Anaheim in a 3–1 win to give the Predators a 3–2 series lead. In Game 6 at Bridgestone Arena, Åberg assisted 2 of Sissons' 3 goals to help the Predators advance to their first ever Stanley Cup Finals.

On 18 July 2017, the Predators re-signed Aberg to a two-year, $1.3 million contract worth $650,000 annually. During his time with the Predators', he was given the nickname "The Pope".

Edmonton Oilers
In the 2017–18 season, at the NHL trade deadline on 25 February 2018, Åberg was dealt by the Predators to the Edmonton Oilers in exchange for Mark Letestu. He made his Oilers debut on 27 February against the San Jose Sharks. He scored his first point as an Oiler in his debut with an assist on a goal from Jesse Puljujärvi, in a 5–2 loss to the Sharks. In remaining with the Oilers to play out the season, Åberg contributed with 2 goals and 8 points in 16 games.

Anaheim Ducks
After attending the Oilers 2018 training camp, Åberg was unable to retain his roster spot approaching the 2018–19 season. On 1 October 2018, he was claimed off waivers by the Anaheim Ducks. He made his debut with the Ducks in an opening night 5–2 victory over the San Jose Sharks on 3 October 2018. After a brief stint with AHL affiliate, the San Diego Gulls, Åberg returned to the Ducks scoring two goals in consecutive games on 28 and 30 October against the Sharks and Philadelphia Flyers. Through 37 games with the Ducks, Åberg had already eclipsed career highs offensively, placing second on the team with 11 goals and recording 19 points before he was relegated as a healthy scratch through a franchise record losing streak.

Minnesota Wild
On 16 January 2019, Åberg's tenure with the Ducks ended as he was dealt to the Minnesota Wild in exchange for Justin Kloos. Åberg was unable to replicate his offensive pace with the Wild, remaining on the roster through the conclusion of the regular season to post 1 goal and 6 points in 22 games. On 25 June 2019, Åberg was not tendered a qualifying offer by the Wild, releasing him to free agency.

Toronto Maple Leafs
On 24 July 2019, Åberg signed as a free agent to a one-year, $700,000 deal with the Toronto Maple Leafs. In the 2019–20 season, Åberg was primarily assigned to AHL affiliate, the Toronto Marlies. He was productive with the Marlies, registering 20 goals and 44 points in 55 games, while making just 5 appearances with the Maple Leafs adding 1 assist. With the remainder of the AHL season cancelled due to the COVID-19 pandemic, Åberg as an impending restricted free agent returned to his native Sweden.

Traktor Chelyabinsk
Left off the Maple Leafs return to play training camp roster, Åberg effectively left the NHL by signing a one-year contract with Russian club, Traktor Chelyabinsk of the Kontinental Hockey League (KHL) on 13 July 2020. On 25 August 2020, Åberg's NHL rights were included in a six player trade by the Maple Leafs to the Pittsburgh Penguins, along with Kasperi Kapanen and Jesper Lindgren, in exchange for Evan Rodrigues, David Warsofsky, Filip Hållander and the 15th overall pick in the 2020 NHL Entry Draft. Åberg continued in the KHL for the duration of the 2020–21 season, where in 49 games he had 10 goals and 23 points for Traktor.

Ottawa Senators
After his lone season in Russia, Åberg returned to the NHL as a free agent, securing a one-year, two-way contract with Canadian club, the Ottawa Senators, on 29 July 2021. After attending the Senators 2021 training camp, Åberg failed to make the opening night roster and was re-assigned to AHL affiliate, the Belleville Senators, to begin the  season.

Åberg collected 2 goals and 9 assists for 11 points through 17 games with Belleville. Unable to earn a recall to Ottawa, on 6 December 2021, he was placed on unconditional waivers in order to mutually terminate the remainder of his contract with the Senators.

Return to Europe
Åberg as a free agent from the Senators immediately opted to return to his native Sweden, signing for the remainder of the season with Timrå IK of the SHL on 7 December 2021.

After helping the club avoid relegation, Åberg left Timrå in the off-season and initially joined Czech club, BK Mladá Boleslav of the Czech Extraliga (ELH) on 15 June 2022. In the following 2022–23 season, Åberg registered 3 goals and 13 points through 26 games before opting to conclude his contract in order to continue his journeyman career, in joining Swiss club, SC Rapperswil-Jona Lakers of the NL, for the remainder of the season on 10 December 2022.

Career statistics

Regular season and playoffs

International

References

External links
 

1993 births
Living people
Anaheim Ducks players
Belleville Senators players
BK Mladá Boleslav players
Djurgårdens IF Hockey players
Edmonton Oilers players
Swedish expatriate ice hockey players in Canada
Färjestad BK players
Milwaukee Admirals players
Minnesota Wild players
Nashville Predators draft picks
Nashville Predators players
SC Rapperswil-Jona Lakers players
San Diego Gulls (AHL) players
Ice hockey people from Stockholm
Swedish expatriate ice hockey players in the United States
Swedish ice hockey forwards
Timrå IK players
Toronto Maple Leafs players
Toronto Marlies players
Traktor Chelyabinsk players
Swedish expatriate sportspeople in the Czech Republic
Swedish expatriate sportspeople in Russia
Swedish expatriate sportspeople in Switzerland
Expatriate ice hockey players in the Czech Republic
Expatriate ice hockey players in Russia
Expatriate ice hockey players in Switzerland